Triassic Nunatak is a small nunatak 1.5 nautical miles (2.8 km) southwest of Jurassic Nunatak in the west extremity of Yee Nunataks, Palmer Land. Named by Advisory Committee on Antarctic Names (US-ACAN) in 1987 after the Triassic Period in geological time and in association with Jurassic Nunatak. The name does not imply the age of the rock constituting this feature.

Nunataks of Palmer Land